Arachnis martina is a moth of the family Erebidae. It was described by Herbert Druce in 1897. It is found in Mexico.

References

Moths described in 1897
Spilosomina
Moths of Central America